The Maoluo River is a tributary of the Wu River (Dadu River) in Taiwan. It is the main tributary on the left bank of the Wu River. Originating from the Jialishan Range, it flows east of the Bagua Plateau through Nantou County, Changhua County, and Taichung City for 47 kilometers.

See also
List of rivers in Taiwan

References

Rivers of Taiwan
Landforms of Changhua County
Landforms of Taichung
Landforms of Nantou County